BSWM may refer to:

 Black Skin, White Masks, a 1952 book
 Bureau of Soils and Water Management, an agency of the Philippine government